The Orange Line is an East-West line of the Kaohsiung Metro in Kaohsiung, Taiwan. It opened on 14 September 2008, the day of Mid-Autumn Festival, for a week-long free trial service. After the free trial service, the Kaohsiung Metro offered a month-long single one-way promotional NT$15 service on both the Red and the Orange line, with regular ticket price applies after this.

The  line has 14 stations and is the second metro line to open in southern Taiwan. Shortly prior to opening, flaws such as emergency exit lighted signs, unclear ticket displays, and jammed emergency exits were fixed. Although it was originally supposed to open with the Red Line, it was delayed due to tunnel collapse during construction December 2005.

Stations

References

Kaohsiung Metro
Railway lines opened in 2008
Standard gauge railways in Taiwan